Floyd Ernest Wheeler (March 18, 1905 – February 9, 1995) was an American politician, teacher, and lawyer.

Born in Beloit, Wisconsin, Wheeler received his bachelor's degree from Beloit College and his law degree from University of Wisconsin Law School. He also did graduate work at Harvard Law School. He practiced law, taught at Evansville High School, and was the assistant physical director at the Beloit YMCA. Wheeler was also the assistant to the dean of the University of Wisconsin College of Letters and Science. In 1953, Wheeler served in the Wisconsin State Assembly and was a Democrat. He lived in Madison, Wisconsin and died there in 1995.

Notes

1905 births
1995 deaths
Politicians from Beloit, Wisconsin
Politicians from Madison, Wisconsin
Beloit College alumni
University of Wisconsin Law School alumni
Harvard Law School alumni
Educators from Wisconsin
Wisconsin lawyers
20th-century American politicians
Lawyers from Madison, Wisconsin
20th-century American lawyers
Democratic Party members of the Wisconsin State Assembly